Sheree Hovsepian (born 1974) is an Iranian-born American artist. She primarily works in photography and collage, in addition to sculpture and drawing. Her work is often concerned with the human form and matters of identity. She is based in New York City, with houses in the Gramercy Park neighborhood and in Bridgehampton in the Hamptons.

Biography 
Sheree Hovsepian was born in 1974 in Isfahan, Iran. In 1976, her family immigrated to the United States, when she was 2 years old and she was raised in Toledo, Ohio. Hovsepian attended University of Toledo for her undergraduate degree, graduating in 1999. Later she continued her studies at the School of the Art Institute of Chicago (SAIC), where she studied under the late Barbara DeGenevieve and received her Master of Fine Arts degree in 2002. She met her future husband, artist Rashid Johnson while at SAIC. Together with Johnson, they have one son.

Hovsepian's work often is collage, featuring a photograph of the human body and mirroring geometric shapes and including other materials, such as found objects, fabric, paper, wood, and string.  Hovsepian cites artists Sofie Calle, Annette Messeger, Lorna Simpson and Ana Mendieta as influences.

Her work is in various public museum collections including at the Solomon R. Guggenheim Museum, the Bronx Museum of the Arts, the Art Institute of Chicago, the Studio Museum in Harlem, among others.

See also 

 List of Iranian women artists

References 

1974 births
Living people
21st-century American women photographers
21st-century American photographers
People from Toledo, Ohio
University of Toledo alumni
School of the Art Institute of Chicago alumni
Artists from New York City
Women collage artists
Iranian emigrants to the United States
American artists of Iranian descent